Matteuccia de Francesco (died 1428) was an alleged Italian witch and nun, known as the "Witch of Ripabianca" after the village where she lived.

Matteuccia was put on trial in Todi in 1428, accused of being a prostitute, having committed desecration with other women and of the selling of love potions since 1426. She confessed having sold medicine and of having flown to a tree in the shape of a fly on the back of a demon after having smeared herself with an ointment made of the blood of newborn children. She was judged guilty of sorcery and sentenced to be burned at the stake.

Her case was one of the earliest witch trials in Europe, and perhaps the first case where a witch is mentioned flying in the air.

References 

 Jan Guillou, Häxornas försvarare, Piratförlaget 2002 
 

People executed for witchcraft
1428 deaths
Executed Italian people
People executed by the Papal States by burning
Executed Italian women
15th-century Italian Roman Catholic religious sisters and nuns
Year of birth unknown
Witch trials in Italy